The 1934–35 season was the 35th season of competitive football in Belgium. RU Saint-Gilloise won their 11th and 3rd consecutive Premier Division title. The Belgian Cup was held for the first time since the 1926-27 and was won by Daring Club de Bruxelles SR, beating Lyra TSV in the final (3-2). The Belgium national football team played 5 friendly games.

Overview
At the end of the season, RRC de Gand and Belgica FC Edegem were relegated to Division I, while RFC Brugeois (Division I A winner) and RSC Anderlechtois (Division I B winner) were promoted to the Premier Division.SV Blankenberghe, RC Borgerhout, RFC Liégeois and Turnhoutsche SK Hand-in-Hand were relegated from Division I to Promotion, to be replaced by VG Ostende, FC Duffel, US Centre and Waterschei SV.

National team

* Belgium score given first

Key
 H = Home match
 A = Away match
 N = On neutral ground
 F = Friendly
 o.g. = own goal

Honours

Final league tables

Premier Division

References